Sparsham is a 1999 Indian Malayalam film, directed by Mohan Roop. The film stars Manoj K. Jayan, Thilakan, Murali and Siddique in the lead roles. The film has musical score by Sharreth.

Cast
Manoj K. Jayan as Mahesh
Thilakan as Pothuval Ashan
Murali as Valappil Raghavan
Siddique as Ashokan
Kaveri as Arudhathi
Priya Raman as Rajani
Chandni Shaju as Meera
Jagadish as Shivadasan
Manuraj as Prasad
Meena Ganesh as Bhargaviyamma
Ponnamma Babu as Sarojini
Sarath Haridas as Manu
 Tony as Hareedran
Sathaar as Rajashekharan
T. S. Raju as Sreekandan Nair
Vishnu Prasad - Cameo Appearance

Soundtrack
The music was composed by Sharreth and the lyrics were written by S. Ramesan Nair.

References

External links
 

1999 films
1990s Malayalam-language films
Films scored by Sharreth